Huang Kuo-chang (born ) is a Taiwanese politician, activist, legal scholar, researcher and writer. He is one of the lead figures of the Sunflower Student Movement and joined the New Power Party shortly afterwards. He served as leader of the party from 2015 to 2019, and represented New Taipei City of Xizhi District in the Legislative Yuan on behalf of the NPP between 2016 and 2020.

Early life
Huang Kuo-chang was born into a traditional farming family in Xizhi Township, Taipei County. He graduated from National Taiwan University in 1995, and he continued his education at Cornell University in Ithaca, New York for a master's degree and a doctorate.

Political career
One of the lead figures of the Sunflower Student Movement, Huang joined the New Power Party in May 2015, and was named acting chairperson in July. That same month, Huang announced that he would enter the legislative election in 2016 as a New Power Party candidate for the 12th constituency of New Taipei City. The constituency, which includes Xizhi, Ruifang, Jinshan, Wanli, Pingxi, Shuangxi and Gongliao, was represented by incumbent Kuomintang legislator Lee Ching-hua. In September, the NPP announced that Huang would serve on a seven-member committee of party leaders, which included Freddy Lim and Neil Peng. As the Democratic Progressive Party did not fill in candidates in the constituency, in order to support Huang. In the elections held on 16 January 2016, Huang beat the incumbent Lee and won the seat in the legislature. After taking office, Huang was assigned to the Finance Committee.

Court proceedings against 21 protesters began in June 2016. First to be charged with various offenses included Chen Wei-ting, Huang Kuo-chang, and Lin Fei-fan. In a March 2017 Taipei District Court decision, Chen, Huang and Lin were acquitted of incitement charges.

Votes in favor of the recall outnumbered those against, but fell short of the required threshold, one-fourth of the district's total electorate. Huang stepped down as chairman of the New Power Party in January 2019. In June 2019, Huang stated that he would leave the New Power Party if it became a "sidekick" of the Democratic Progressive Party, but he denied that he was forming a new political party. Huang stated in August 2019 that he would support the 2020 legislative campaign of Lai Chia-lun, who sought to succeed Huang as the legislator representing New Taipei 12. Huang was offered a position on the New Power proportional representation party list. Though the party backed his return to the Legislative Yuan, it later explored drafting Huang to contest the 2020 Taiwan presidential election. Huang refused to stand in the election, and the New Power Party later announced that it would not nominate a presidential candidate. Huang was ranked fourth on the New Power Party list of at-large legislative candidates. The NPP won over seven percent of the party list vote, allowing only three at-large legislative candidates to take office.

Publications
Journal Articles
Kuo-Chang Huang, Kong-Pin Chen, Chang-Ching Lin, 2015, "Party Capability versus Court Preference: Why do the "Haves" Come Out Ahead?－An Empirical Lesson from the Taiwan Supreme Court", JOURNAL OF LAW ECONOMICS & ORGANIZATION, 31(1), 93–126. (SSCI) (IF: 1.036; SSCI ranking: 37.7%,30.5%) 
Kuo-Chang Huang, Chang-Ching Lin, & Kong-Pin Chen, 2014, "Do Rich and Poor Behave Similarly in Seeking Legal Advice? Lessons from Taiwan in Comparative Perspective", LAW & SOCIETY REVIEW, 48(1), 193–223. (SSCI) (IF: 1.31; SSCI ranking: 22.1%,21.2%) 
Kuo-Chang Huang & Chang-Ching Lin, 2014, "Mock Jury Trials in Taiwan—Paving theGround for Introducing Lay Participation", LAW AND HUMAN BEHAVIOR, 38(4), 367–377. (SSCI) (IF: 2.153; SSCI ranking: 7.6%,16.7%)
Book Chapters
Kuo-Chang Huang, accepted, "The Effect of Stakes on Settlement—An Empirical Lesson from Taiwan", editor(s): THEODORE EISENBERG, GIOVANNI BATTISTA RAMELLO EDS, RESEARCH HANDBOOKS IN COMPARATIVE LAW AND ECONOMICS, Cheltenham: Edward Elgar Publishing. 
Kuo-Chang Huang, accepted, "Using Associations as a Vehicle for Class Action—The Case of Taiwan", editor(s): Deborah Hensler, CHRIST HODGE EDS, CLASS ACTION IN CONTEXT, Cheltenham: Edward Elgar Publishing
Conference Papers
Kuo-Chang Huang, 2014, "The Impacts of Judicial Reform in Taiwan", paper presented at 4th Brazilian Jurimetrics Conference, Brazil: Brazilian Jurimetrics Association, 2014-05-12 ~ 2014-05-16.

References

External links

  

1973 births
Living people
Taiwanese activists
Politicians of the Republic of China on Taiwan from New Taipei
National Taiwan University alumni
Cornell University alumni
Academic staff of the National Chengchi University
Academic staff of the National Taiwan University
New Power Party Members of the Legislative Yuan
Members of the 9th Legislative Yuan
Formosa Alliance
New Power Party chairpersons
Taiwanese legal scholars
Fulbright alumni